We the Corporations: How American Businesses Won Their Civil Rights is a book-length history of American corporate personhood and other rights of corporations written by constitutional law professor Adam Winkler and published by W. W. Norton in 2018.

The title was a 2018 National Book Award for Nonfiction finalist.

The book won the 2019 Book Award from Scribes--The American Society of Legal Writers.

See also
Citizens United v. FEC

References

Further reading

External links 
 
Discussion with Winkler on We the Corporations, April 24, 2017
Discussion with Winkler on We the Corporations, April 4, 2018

2018 non-fiction books
21st-century history books
Books about United States legal history
United States constitutional law
W. W. Norton & Company books
American non-fiction books
Corporate personhood
English-language books